Ahmed Bamsaud (born 22 November 1995) is a Saudi Arabian professional footballer who plays as a left back for Al-Ittihad.

Club career
Bamsaud started his career at the youth teams of Al-Hilal. He signed his first professional contract with the club on 31 August 2016. On 20 June 2017, Bamsuad joined Al-Fayha on loan from Al-Hilal for the 2017–18 season. On 5 June 2018, Bamsaud joined Al-Fayha on a permanent three-year deal. On 30 January 2020, Bamsaud renewed his contract with Al-Fayha for another two years. On 19 May 2022, Bamsaud started the 2022 King Cup final and helped Al-Fayha win their first-ever King Cup title. On 29 August 2022, Bamsaud joined Al-Ittihad on a three-year contract.

Career statistics

Club

Honours

Al-Fayha
King Cup: 2021–22

Al-Ittihad
Saudi Super Cup: 2022

References

External links
 
 

Living people
1995 births
Association football fullbacks
Saudi Arabian footballers
Saudi Arabia youth international footballers
Saudi Arabia international footballers
Al Hilal SFC players
Al-Fayha FC players
Ittihad FC players
Saudi Professional League players
Saudi First Division League players